NGHTCRWLRS are an American rock band from New Jersey.

History 
NGHTCRWLRS are a four-piece indie rock band from North Jersey, that formed in 2014. The band members were in other Hudson County, New Jersey groups; vocalist and guitarist Frank DeFranco played in Holy City Zoo, vocalist and guitarist Eric Goldberg was in the Nico Blues, vocalist and bassist Brian Goglia played in They Had Faces Then and Man on Fire, and vocalist and drummer Max Rauch was in Washington Square Park. In the Jersey Journal DeFranco recalls, that "when we all started sharing a practice space in Clifton[,] it became a place where we all knew and trusted each other, and we all started playing with each other whenever any of us were free." The band draws comparison to the music of Title Fight, Fugazi and Sonic Youth. NGHTCRWLRS' first release is the song "Lt. Dan" for the Sniffling Indie Kids compilation, Space Jamz: 5 Bands 1 Practice Space.

Sniffling Indie Kids released NGHTCRWLRS on February 28, 2015, and the record release party was held that night at The Dopeness in Jersey City, New Jersey, with Cicada Radio, Dentist, and France. Chris Rotolo of Speak Into My Good Eye calls the lead track "Smiling" "the greatest Emo anthem Grouplove never wrote." The music video for Smiling was released on September 2, 2016, and it contains footage of the band rehearsing and performing. The album ranked No. 9 on The New York Observers 10 Best Debut Albums of 2015.

NGHTCRWLRS performed at the 2016 North Jersey Indie Rock Festival. Their second album Raging Hot was released by Sniffling Indie Kids on November 11, 2016. It is described as a "mix of abrasive and intense rock anthems and jazzy and mellow tunes."

Band members 
Frank DeFranco – vocals and guitar
Brian Goglia – vocals and guitar
Eric Goldberg – vocals and bass
Max Rauch – vocals and drums

Discography 

Albums
NGHTCRWLRS (2015)
Raging Hot (2016)

Appearing on
Space Jamz: 5 Bands 1 Practice Space (2014)

References 
Citations

Bibliography

External links 

Indie rock musical groups from New Jersey
Musical groups established in 2014
Sniffling Indie Kids artists
2014 establishments in New Jersey